This is a list of sea captains. The list includes merchant ship's captains as well as naval ship's captains. It is limited to those notable in this role (those who already have Wikipedia articles).

Fictional sea captains
 Captain Ahab, fictional character and hero of Herman Melville's novel Moby-Dick
 Captain Jack Aubrey, hero of the Aubrey–Maturin series by Patrick O'Brian
 John Blackthorne, hero of James Clavell's 1975 novel Shōgun
 Captain Birdseye, advertising mascot for the Birds Eye frozen food brand
 Captain Ned Dana, master of the S.S. Balaska in the series The Dana Girls
 Sea Captain Luis Delatorre the Bull " Greatest Pirate of Oklahoma"
 Captain Crook, nominal spoof of Captain Cook; resident pirate captain of McDonaldland representing McDonald's "Filet-o-Fish" sandwich
 Cap'n Crunch, mascot character for the cereal of the same name
 Captain Dog, boat captain in the cartoon movie series Peppa Pig
 Captain Englehorn, captain in a number of the King Kong films
 Captain Gault, sea captain of a number of stories by English writer William Hope Hodgson
 Captain Jonas Grumby, a.k.a. "The Skipper", from Gilligan's Island
 Captain Haddock, captain in the comic album series The Adventures of Tintin
 Captain James Hook, captain in the play and novel Peter Pan
 Horatio Hornblower, protagonist of a series of novels by C. S. Forester
 John Silas Huntly, captain in The Survivors of the Chancellor
 Captain Jat, sea captain of a number of stories by English writer William Hope Hodgson
 Maak, ship's captain in the comic strip Maakies
 Captain Horatio McCallister, recurring character from the TV series The Simpsons
 Captain Pugwash, captain of pirate ship in a cartoon of the same name
 Ralph Rackstraw, originally a sailor on the HMS Pinafore (again, from the aforementioned Gilbert & Sullivan operetta); ultimately turns out to be the real captain of the Pinafore
 Captain Ralls, captain played by John Wayne in Wake of the Red Witch
 Captain Jack Sparrow, captain of the pirate ship Black Pearl in Pirates of the Caribbean films
 John Charity Spring, slave ship captain in Flash for Freedom and other novels of The Flashman Papers series by George MacDonald Fraser
 Captain Merrill Stubing, captain in The Love Boat television series
 Cap'n Turbot, a main character in the Canadian TV series PAW Patrol
 Unnamed pirate captain who calls himself a "pirate king", who took Frederic in as an apprentice in Gilbert & Sullivan's operetta, The Pirates of Penzance
 Captain Jakob Skiba in 'The Story of My Wife', written by Milán Füst.
 Captain Edward Kenway, captain of the Jackdaw, Assassin's Creed IV

See also
 Bibliography of early American naval history
 Bibliography of 18th-19th century Royal Naval history
 List of single-ship actions

References

Sea captains